Styphelia conostephioides is a plant in the family Ericaceae native to Western Australia. It was first described in 1839 as Leucopogon conostephioides by Augustin Pyramus de Candolle. In 1867 Ferdinand von Mueller transferred it to the genus, Styphelia, but the accepted name continued to be Leucopogon conostephioides. However in 2020, with a publication concerning the phylogeny of Styphelia by Crayn and others, the name Styphelia conostephioides was accepted by the Herbarium of Western Australia. (The Council of Heads of Australasian Herbaria still (May 2020) lists Leucopogon conostephioides as the accepted name.)

References

conostephioides
Ericales of Australia
Flora of Western Australia
Plants described in 1839
Taxa named by Ferdinand von Mueller